Robert Orris Blake (April 7, 1921 – December 28, 2015) was an American diplomat who served as the United States Ambassador to Mali from 1970 to 1973.

Early life
Blake was born in Los Angeles, California on April 7, 1921 and grew up in Whittier, California. He was the son of Frank Orris Blake and Marjorie (née Edwards) Blake.

Blake received a Bachelor of Arts from Stanford University in 1943 and a Master of Arts in 1947 from Johns Hopkins University School of Advanced International Studies. From 1943 to 1946, Blake was a Lieutenant in the U.S. Navy during World War II.

Career
During his 30-year career in United States Foreign service, Blake served as Ambassador to Mali from December 10, 1970 until May 20, 1973 as a member of the Nixon administration, serving under U.S. Secretary of State Henry Kissinger. From August 1968 until December 1970, Blake was Deputy Chief of Mission, Paris. Prior to Paris Blake served in Managua, Nicaragua, Moscow, Russia, Tokyo, Japan, Tunis, Tunisia, and as Deputy Chief of Mission in Kinshasa. He was also the Officer in Charge of U.S.S.R. Affairs, and Advisor on Political and Security Affairs, United States Mission to the United Nations, and United States Representative to the Joint Commission on the Environment.

Blake was the Senior Fellow at the World Resources Institute, where he served as the Chairman of the Committee on Agricultural Sustainability. He was a member of the Council on Foreign Relations, National Advisory Board of the Natural Resources Council of Maine, and the Maine Coast Heritage Trust.

Personal life
On July 28, 1956, Blake was married to Sylvia Whitehouse at the Trinity Episcopal Church in Newport, Rhode Island. Sylvia was the daughter of diplomat Edwin Sheldon Whitehouse and sister of Ambassador Charles S. Whitehouse (father of Sheldon Whitehouse, a current U.S. Senator from Rhode Island). Robert and Sylvia had one daughter and two sons, including:

 Robert O. Blake, Jr., a career diplomat who served as U.S. Ambassador to Sri Lanka and the Maldives, the Assistant Secretary of State for South and Central Asian Affairs and U.S. Ambassador to Indonesia
 Lucy Blake, a conservationist who serves as the president of Northern Sierra Partnership.
 George Whitehouse Blake

Blake died of prostate cancer at his home in Washington, D.C. on December 28, 2015.

References

1921 births
2015 deaths
People from Los Angeles
Stanford University alumni
United States Navy personnel of World War II
Paul H. Nitze School of Advanced International Studies alumni
Ambassadors of the United States to Mali
United States Foreign Service personnel
American expatriates in France
American expatriates in the Soviet Union
American expatriates in Nicaragua
American expatriates in Japan
American expatriates in Tunisia
American expatriates in the Democratic Republic of the Congo